Alpujarra is the twelfth station on Medellín Metro from north to south. It is located in the center of the municipality of Medellín and is adjacent to La Alpujarra Administrative Center, which it is named after. Alpujarra is also located near the Barefoot Park, the Medellín Metropolitan Theatre, the Interactive Museum EPM, and Plaza Cisneros. The station was opened on 30 November 1995 as part of the inaugural section of Line A, from Niquía to Poblado.

The station is adjacent to the San Juan Avenue, a road that crosses the city from east to west central downtown and that provides easy access from Buenos Aires to the east with La Américan to the west. It is also on Bolívar Avenue, leading from downtown to the South Highway that goes to the southwest of Colombia.

References

External links
 Official site of Medellín Metro 

Medellín Metro stations
Railway stations opened in 1995
1995 establishments in Colombia